Small Shots is an American reality TV program about two young filmmakers traveling across the country, going to small towns and using real people to make short movie spoofs. It was shown on The New TNN.

External links
 

2001 American television series debuts
2003 American television series endings
2000s American reality television series
The Nashville Network original programming